Parts of this article have been adapted from the BC Parks website.

Mquqʷin/Brooks Peninsula Provincial Park is a provincial park located on the west coast of Vancouver Island in British Columbia, Canada.

History
As a result of land-use planning for Vancouver Island, this former 28,780 hectare (71,117 acre) recreation area (established in 1986) was upgraded in 1995 to a Class 'A' Provincial Park. In addition to this upgrade, 22,851 hectares (56,466 acres) known as the Brooks-Nasparti area, has been added to the park. On July 13, 2009, the park was renamed Brooks Peninsula Provincial Park (a.k.a. Mquqʷin) and, in 2018, Mquqʷin/Brooks Peninsula Provincial Park under the guidance of the Che:k'tles7et'h' peoples.

Geography
The park is 51,631 hectares (127,583 acres) in size. Brooks Peninsula is located about 20 kilometres (12 mi) southwest of Port Alice, British Columbia. Access to the park is by boat or float plane.

Brooks Peninsula juts 20 kilometres (12 mi) into the Pacific Ocean and has a rugged and varied coastline, with long fjords and sandy beaches. The inland is seldom-explored and densely wooded with mostly old growth forest.

The highest point is a sub-peak of Snowsaddle Mountain at 1143 m (3,750 ft) elevation. Mountains in the park, known as the Refugium Range, include Klaskish (963m or 3,159 ft), Nunatak (930m or 3,051 ft), and Doom (787m or 2,582 ft).  Peaks in the area higher than 700 m (2,300 ft) were above the glaciers during the last ice age and are therefore a refugium with unique plants.

Conservation

Unaffected by the last ice age, Brooks Peninsula is considered a unique geologic feature. As a result, the geology of the peninsula is different from that of the rest of Vancouver Island and many rare plant communities exist, providing unparalleled opportunities for scientific study. This remote wilderness area includes an extensive, wild ocean coastline, long sheltered inlets, rugged mountains, pristine estuaries with high waterfowl and fishery values and high biodiversity values associated with old-growth forests. The Brooks-Nasparti addition encompasses the entire watershed of the Nasparti River and streams draining into Johnson Lagoon, the west-facing slopes along Nasparti Inlet, the Power River and Battle Creek watersheds and the Mount Seaton area

The park preserves the peninsula's pristine wilderness landscape, which contains the Refugium Range of the Vancouver Island Ranges and Coastal Western Hemlock biogeoclimatic zone.

Cultural Heritage

The park is located within the traditional territory of the peoples comprising today's Kyuquot/Cheklesahht and Quatsino First Nations band governments. Battle Bay in the southern portion of the park is rich in First Nations cultural history. Many battles were fought at this location in order to retain control of this prosperous area. First Nations reserves located adjacent to the southern portion of Brooks Peninsula Provincial Park are not for recreational use. Visitors are encouraged to contact the Kyuquot/Cheklesahht First Nation band office in Kyuquot prior to exploring Brooks Peninsula.

Recreation
Brooks Peninsula is infrequently visited; its surrounding waters however provide superb kayaking and canoeing. It is entirely undeveloped and has no marked trails and no facilities, although in some locations ocean debris is placed at known trail heads.

Camping is permitted anywhere in the park, but made complicated due to the remoteness, difficulty of access, and lack of facilities.

Nearby Solander Island is an Ecological Reserve and access is prohibited.

Gallery

See also
List of British Columbia Provincial Parks
List of Canadian provincial parks

References

External links

Brooks Peninsula Marine Provincial Park at BC Parks
Brooks Peninsula at the Canadian Mountain Encyclopedia
 A collection of aerial photos of Brooks Peninsula

Peninsulas of British Columbia
Provincial parks of British Columbia
Kyuquot Sound region
Kwakwaka'wakw
Nuu-chah-nulth
1995 establishments in British Columbia